Her Grace Commands is a 1931 German romantic comedy film directed by Hanns Schwarz and starring Käthe von Nagy, Willy Fritsch and Reinhold Schünzel. It is also translated into the alternative title Her Highness Commands. It was shot at the Babelsberg Studios with sets designed by the art director Erich Kettelhut. It premiered in Mannheim on 3 March 1931, before being released at the Gloria-Palast in Berlin the next day. A French-language version (Princess, At Your Orders!) was produced simultaneously, also directed by Schwarz but with a different cast. The film was remade in Hollywood as well, retitled Adorable, and released by the Fox Film Corporation in 1933.

Synopsis
A hairdresser and a greengrocer fall in love, concealing from each other the truth that they are really a princess and an army officer in disguise.

Main cast
 Käthe von Nagy as Prinzessin Marie-Christine
 Willy Fritsch as Leutnant Karl von Conradi
 Reinhold Schünzel as Staatsminister Graf Herlitz
 Paul Hörbiger as Hofdetektiv Pipac
 Paul Heidemann as Fürst von Leuchtenstein
 Michael von Newlinsky as Rittmeister
 Eugen Tiller as Major
 Kenneth Rive as König
 Erich Kestin as Bursche bei Conradi
 Erik Schütz as Stimmungssänger
 Attila Hörbiger as Wachtposten

References

Bibliography

External links

1931 films
1931 musical comedy films
German musical comedy films
Films of the Weimar Republic
1930s German-language films
Films directed by Hanns Schwarz
Films with screenplays by Billy Wilder
Films set in Europe
German multilingual films
UFA GmbH films
German black-and-white films
1931 romantic comedy films
1931 multilingual films
Films shot at Babelsberg Studios
1930s German films